is the twenty-first album by Yuko Ogura & Kyōko Koizumi.  It was released in 1996.  The music for this album was composed by School Rumble and soundtrack composer Yoko Kanno.  The title song "Otoko no Ko Onna no Ko" was first released as a single then later included on this album.

Track listing

Red Goldfish

Cactus
"Dream Recorder"	
"For My Life"

Let's Return to the Room ～When I die

Boys Girls (Somewhat Delicious Edit)

""
Broken Guitar

The Window in My Room

Important Feelings"Deep Green Velvet''

Personnel
 Kyōko Koizumi - Vocals, lyrics (all tracks except 7 which is an instrumental track)
 Yoko Kanno - Composer, arrangement   
 Kaori Moriwaka - Composer (Track 2 only)
 Tamio Okuda - Composer (Track 6 only)
 Tataku Kamoshi - Composer (Track 8 only)
 Ryuunu Hokujo - Composer (Track 8 only)
 SAMPLY RED - Composer (Track 9 only)

External links
 Otoko no Ko Onna no Ko at Victor Entertainment
 Otoko no Ko Onna no Ko at CDJapan
  Otoko no Ko Onna no Ko at the Club Koizumi Maniacs fan page
 Otoko no Ko Onna no Ko at The Yoko Kanno Database

1996 albums
Kyoko Koizumi albums
Victor Entertainment albums